Principal Olivil is a 1985 Indian Malayalam-language film,  directed by Gopikrishnan and produced by Krishnakumari and K. P. Sasi. The film stars Nedumudi Venu, Bharath Gopi, Menaka and Sukumari. The film's score was composed by Alleppey Ranganath.

Cast

Nedumudi Venu as MA Babu MA
Bharath Gopi as Vasavan Pillai
Menaka as Malathi
Bhagyalakshmi (actress)
Sukumari as Vasumathi
Jagathy Sreekumar as Kuttappan
Adoor Bhasi as Sub Inspector
V. D. Rajappan as Rajappan
KPAC Sunny as Adv. Varma
Kuthiravattam Pappu as Ayyappan
Meenu as Urmila
Noohu as Maniyan
Sabitha Anand as Sreedevi
Sreenath as Sudheer
Lathika

Soundtrack
The music was composed by Alleppey Ranganath with lyrics by Bichu Thirumala.

References

External links
 

1985 films
1980s Malayalam-language films